
Złotów County is a unit of territorial administration and local government (powiat) in Greater Poland Voivodeship, west-central Poland.

As of 2011, its total population is 68,791, out of which the population of Złotów is 18,303, that of Jastrowie is 8,485, that of Okonek is 3,855, that of Krajenka is 3,659, and the rural population is 34,489.

History
For centuries, the area was part of the Kingdom of Poland and the Greater Poland region (often called the "cradle of Poland"), which beginning in the 10th-century formed the heart of the early Polish state. From 1772 to 1945, it was part of Prussia and Germany, contained mainly in the district called Kreis Flatow (Złotów), although parts were in Kreis Deutsch Krone (Jastrowie). 

In post-war Poland, Złotów County was in Szczecin Voivodeship from 1946 to 1950, and then in Koszalin Voivodeship until 1975, when the powiats were abolished. From 1975 until 1998, the area was part of Piła Voivodeship. The county was recreated on January 1, 1999, as a result of the Polish local government reforms passed in 1998, which reintroduced the powiats and created sixteen larger voivodeships.

Neighbouring counties
Złotów County is bordered by Szczecinek County to the northwest, Człuchów County to the northeast, Sępólno County to the east, Piła County to the south, and Wałcz County and Drawsko County to the west.

Administrative division
The county is subdivided into eight gminas (one urban, three urban-rural and four rural). These are listed in the following table, in descending order of population.

References
Area and Population in the Territorial Profile in 2011

External links
Official website
Map

 
Land counties of Greater Poland Voivodeship